The Maryland Terrapins men's soccer team represents the University of Maryland in National Collegiate Athletic Association (NCAA) college soccer competition. The program has won four NCAA Division I College Cup national championships (1968, 2005, 2008, 2018). Maryland won nineteen Atlantic Coast Conference (ACC) regular season championships (1953–68, 1971, 2012, 2013) and six ACC tournament championships (1996, 2002, 2008, 2010, 2012, 2013) before joining the Big Ten Conference on July 1, 2014. The Terps won the 2014, 2016, and 2022 Big Ten Conference men's soccer championships and the 2014 and 2015 men's soccer tournament titles.

History 
Maryland fielded its first varsity soccer team in 1946. It was coached by Doyle Royal, who remained in that position through 1973.

In 1948, Royal led the Terrapins to an undefeated record, including an upset that ended Temple's 19-game winning streak. The only blemish on the season was a 4–4 tie against Loyola of Maryland, and the team had one of the strongest cases in the nation for the title of the mythical national championship. The NCAA did not sponsor a championship until 1959. 

In 1968, Maryland defeated San Jose State, 4–3, to advance to the NCAA National Championship game. There, they tied Michigan State, 2–2, in order to take a share of their first national title. In 1974, Bud Beardmore, a future National Lacrosse Hall of Fame inductee, took over as men's soccer coach for one season. Sasho Cirovski was hired as head coach in 1993. He led the Terrapins to capture three more national championships in 2005, 2008, and 2018.

Current roster

Year-by-year record

Professional players

EFL Championship
Zack Steffen (Middlesbrough FC) * (on loan from Manchester City)

MLS
Ben Bender (Charlotte FC)
Joshua Bolma (New England Revolution)
Chase Gasper (LA Galaxy) *
Malcolm Johnston (New York City FC)
Zac MacMath (Real Salt Lake)
Omar Gonzalez (New England Revolution) *
Donovan Pines (D.C. United) *
Chris Rindov (Sporting Kansas City)
Jacen Russell-Rowe (Columbus Crew)
Amar Sejdič (Atlanta United FC)
Dayne St. Clair (Minnesota United FC) *
Eryk Williamson (Portland Timbers) *
Graham Zusi (Sporting Kansas City) *

MLS Next Pro
Griffin Dillon (Real Monarchs)
Jake Rozhansky (New England Revolution II)

USL Championship
Alex Crognale (Birmingham Legion FC)
Christiano François (El Paso Locomotive FC) *

3. Liga
Mael Corboz (SC Verl)

Regionalliga West
Gordon Wild (1. FC Bocholt)

Bahraini Premier League
Sunny Jane (East Riffa Club) *

English National League South
Luca Levee (Dulwich Hamlet F.C.) *

Former professional players

Keith Beach
Danny Califf *
Judah Cooks
Rich Costanzo
Eli Crognale
Leo Cullen *
A. J. DeLaGarza *
Michael Dellorusso
Maurice Edu *
Jeremy Hall *
Jason Garey
Clarence Goodson *
Jason Herrick
Sumed Ibrahim
Taylor Kemp
Stephen King
Chris Lancos
Alex Lee *
Ivan Magalhães
Domenic Mediate
Patrick Mullins
Robbie Rogers *
Philip Salyer
Chris Seitz
Abe Thompson
Casey Townsend
Taylor Twellman *
Rodney Wallace *
London Woodberry 
Drew Yates

* – Player has represented their country at the senior national team level

See also 
 Maryland–Virginia men's soccer rivalry

References

External links

 

 
Soccer clubs in Maryland
1946 establishments in Maryland